Jerry O'Connell (born February 17, 1974) is an American actor and television host. He is known for his roles as Quinn Mallory in the television series Sliders, Andrew Clements in My Secret Identity, Vern Tessio in the film Stand by Me (1986), Joe in Joe's Apartment (1996), Frank Cushman in Jerry Maguire (1996), Derek in Scream 2 (1997), Michael in Tomcats (2001), Charlie Carbone in Kangaroo Jack (2003), and Detective Woody Hoyt on the drama Crossing Jordan. He starred as Pete Kaczmarek in the single 2010–2011 season of The Defenders. He also had a starring role in the comedy horror film Piranha 3D (2010). Currently, he voices Commander Jack Ransom on the animated series Star Trek: Lower Decks, is co-host of The Talk, and hosts a version of Pictionary syndicated on Fox stations.

Early life
O'Connell was born in Manhattan, the eldest son of Linda, an art teacher, and Michael O'Connell, an advertising agency art director originally from the United Kingdom. He is of half Irish, one quarter Italian, and one quarter Polish ancestry. O'Connell's paternal grandfather was from County Cork, Ireland while his maternal grandmother was from Belfast, Northern Ireland. His maternal grandfather was Charles S. Witkowski, the 34th mayor of Jersey City, New Jersey. O'Connell was raised in Manhattan with his younger brother, actor Charlie O'Connell. As a teenager, he attended Manhattan's Professional Children's School. He attended New York University from 1991 to 1994, majoring in film. While there, he studied screen writing and competed on the fencing team, serving a stint as captain of the sabre squad. He graduated in 1995.

Career
O'Connell began his acting career at a young age. As a child, he did commercial work for Duncan Hines cookies. Shortly after turning eleven, he landed his first feature film role as the character Vern Tessio in Rob Reiner's Stand by Me. In 1987, O'Connell appeared in a commercial for Frosted Flakes. He starred in the Canadian science-fiction sitcom My Secret Identity from 1988 to 1991 as the teen hero who develops superhuman traits. During a summer break from NYU, Jerry starred in the feature film Calendar Girl alongside Jason Priestley and Gabriel Olds. He also appeared in the short-lived ABC sitcom Camp Wilder, with Jay Mohr, and Hilary Swank in 1992. During his junior year, O'Connell auditioned for the television pilot Sliders (also filmed in Canada). He was offered the role of Quinn Mallory in the series, which ran for three seasons on Fox and two seasons on the Syfy Channel. He served as producer during his fourth season, and is credited with writing and directing several episodes.

O'Connell has since gone on to star in such movies as Jerry Maguire, Body Shots, Mission to Mars, Tomcats, Scream 2, and Kangaroo Jack. O'Connell has also tried his hand at screenwriting and sold his first screenplay, for First Daughter, to New Regency in 1999. The film was released in 2004 by 20th Century Fox-based Davis Entertainment. O'Connell served as executive producer and received a "story by" credit on the film, which starred Katie Holmes and Michael Keaton.

O'Connell starred as Detective Woody Hoyt on the NBC crime drama Crossing Jordan (2001) until its cancelation in May 2007, and was engaged to actress Rebecca Romijn. He starred opposite her in the Ugly Betty episode "Derailed". He played Hoyt in several episodes of Las Vegas. In 2004, he wore a diaper on Last Call with Carson Daly, during a mock commercial skit for the GoodNites bedwetting product. The National Enquirer caught him filming the skit and printed a photo of him in his diaper.

In 2005, O'Connell guest-starred in one episode of the animated series Justice League Unlimited. In the episode, titled "Clash", he played Captain Marvel. He reprised the role of Captain Marvel in the DC Universe Animated Original Movies short film Superman/Shazam!: The Return of Black Adam alongside George Newbern, who reprised the role of Superman, having done the voice for the animated series. Jerry's younger brother, Charlie has appeared in several productions in which his brother starred, such as in Sliders and Crossing Jordan. In 2007–2008 O'Connell starred in ABC's Carpoolers, which ran from October 2, 2007, to March 4, 2008. In early 2008, O'Connell participated in a widely circulated Internet video parody of the leaked Tom Cruise video on Scientology. Cruise was O'Connell's co-star in Jerry Maguire.

O'Connell co-wrote and appeared in a video parody called "Young Hillary Clinton", satirizing Hillary Clinton's 2008 primary campaign. On February 2, 2008, O'Connell hosted VH1's Pepsi Smash Super Bowl Bash, which aired the night before Super Bowl XLII and featured musical guests Maroon 5 and Mary J. Blige. On April 28, 2008, he appeared as a guest star on ABC's Samantha Who?. In late 2008 O'Connell starred in Fox's Do Not Disturb, co-starring Niecy Nash, but Fox cancelled the show after only three episodes.

O'Connell appeared in the 2009 thriller film Obsessed as "Ben", the best friend and co-worker of the film's protagonist Derek Charles (Idris Elba). He appeared in Eastwick on ABC, on which his wife Romijn starred in the series. He portrayed Derrick Jones in Alexandre Aja's Piranha 3D, which also stars Adam Scott and Elisabeth Shue.

O'Connell co-starred with David Tennant in the pilot for legal drama Rex Is Not Your Lawyer, which was not picked up for production. In 2010, O'Connell starred with Jim Belushi in the CBS comedy drama The Defenders, which was cancelled on May 15, 2011, after one season.

O'Connell appeared on Broadway at the Golden Theatre in Seminar, written by Theresa Rebeck. The play, directed by Sam Gold, opened on November 20, 2011, starring Alan Rickman, Lily Rabe, Hamish Linklater and Hettienne Park. On June 4, 2012, it was announced that O'Connell would play Herman Munster in a reboot of The Munsters, titled Mockingbird Lane; the remake series was never picked up for production, however the pilot would air as a Halloween special on October 26. On May 15, 2013, it was announced that O'Connell would play Stuart Strickland on We Are Men, alongside Tony Shalhoub.

In April 2015, O'Connell returned to Broadway as a ghostwriter in the comedy Living on Love, with Renee Fleming, Anna Chlumsky and Douglas Sills. It closed after 37 performances.

In 2017, O'Connell was the main love interest in a Hallmark movie, co-starring his real-life wife Rebecca Romijn as his former "true love" who walks back into his life in Paris. The movie "Love Locks" has O'Connell owning a hotel that Romijn stays in with her 18-year-old daughter who has come to Paris to study for a semester in an art program.

In January 2020, O'Connell appeared in the Roundabout's American Airlines Theatre's Broadway revival of A Soldier's Play as Captain Taylor in an ensemble cast headed by David Alan Grier and Blair Underwood.

In 2020, he began starring in commercials for Bob Evans grocery items alongside Alfonso Ribeiro.

In July 2021, CBS announced that O'Connell would be joining The Talk as a permanent co-host, replacing Sharon Osbourne. That same month, he hosted a test-run of a new syndicated version of Pictionary on Fox stations, which was successful enough to launch with a full season in fall 2022. He and wife Romijn will host The Real Love Boat on CBS, premiering October 5, 2022.

Personal life
On July 14, 2007, O'Connell married actress and former model Rebecca Romijn. She is a Scorpio. Their twin girls were born in 2008.

O'Connell enrolled in Southwestern Law School in Los Angeles in August 2009, but dropped out to return to acting full-time.

O'Connell has dual American and British citizenship.

O'Connell is a regular guest on the Barstool Sports podcast Pardon My Take, where he discusses his passion for fantasy football.

Filmography

Film

Television

Video games

Music videos
 "David Duchovny" – Bree Sharp
 "Heartbreaker" – Mariah Carey (1999)
 "12 Days of Christmas" from Christmas Queens – Katya Zamolodchikova

Podcast appearances
 Pardon My Take – August 6, 2018; August 23, 2019; July 24, 2020; September 1, 2021; February 9, 2022; September 2, 2022; December 2, 2022
 Comments by Celebs – September 24, 2018
 The Dan LeBatard Show with Stugotz feat. Baron Davis – August 5, 2020
 The Kinda Funny Podcast – April 8, 2021

Awards and nominations

References

External links

 

1978 births
American male child actors
American male film actors
American people of Irish descent
American people of Italian descent
American people of Polish descent
American male television actors
American male voice actors
Living people
Male actors from New York City
New York University alumni
NYU Violets fencers
People from Manhattan
Southwestern Law School alumni
Tisch School of the Arts alumni